Maria Luz Gabás Ariño (born 1968 in Monzón) is a Spanish novelist and scholar of English, best known for her novels Palmeras en la nieve (2012), Regreso a tu play (2014), Como fuego en el hielo (2017), El latido de la tierra (2019) and Lejos de Luisiana (2022), Premio Planeta winner in the same year.

References 

1968 births
Living people
Spanish novelists